Italian ice is a frozen or semi-frozen sweetened treat made with fruit (often from concentrates, juices, or purées) or other natural or artificial food flavorings.
Italian ice is similar to sorbet and snow cones, but differs from American-style sherbet in that it does not contain dairy or egg ingredients. It was introduced to the United States by Italian immigrants and is derived from the Sicilian granita, a similar and related Italian dessert. Common flavors include lemon, cherry, mango, cotton candy and other fruits and sweet victuals.

Finely granulated flavored ice is commonly referred to and sold as water ice by residents and natives of Philadelphia and the Philadelphia metropolitan area (Delaware Valley), including South Jersey and areas of Delaware. Water ice is almost identical to Italian ice, as it is similarly derived from granita brought to the Philadelphia area by Italian immigrants in early 20th century. Though largely synonymous with Italian ice, this “water ice” has also been described as a specific type of Italian ice originating in Philadelphia, or a "variation on the more broadly-accepted Italian ice." Water ice is generally sold in Philadelphia and the Philly area in the late spring and summer months, being one of the most popular iconic frozen desserts sold in the city by virtue of commercial chains such as Rita's Italian Ice.

History
Italian water ice has a long history which can be found first 4000 years ago. The Greeks and Romans used snow from Mount Etna to cool their wines. The Italian word sorbetto and English sherbet come from these sweet fruit syrups that the Arabs used to drink, diluted with ice tiles. For thousands of years, people have kept ice cubes to satisfy their cravings for cold drinks. Today's snow cones may have originated from ice cubes that formed long ago, forming real snow mixed with honey and fruit. In Europe, water ice seems to have appeared at the same time as ice cream in the second half of the 17th century. Both products use the same technology. Water ice can be used as a stand-alone refreshment, dessert, or as a means of restoring the palate midway through a meal of many courses.

Nutrition
Except when made from fruit or fruit juice, Italian ice is defined in US law as a food of minimal nutritional value.

See also

Granita, a Sicilian preparation made of partially frozen water, flavorings, and sometimes sugar
Shaved ice, a class of related but distinct desserts
Slushy, a frozen drink made from flavored ice, similar to granitas

References

Frozen desserts
Italian desserts
Cuisine of New York City
Cuisine of Philadelphia
Italian-American cuisine
Italian-American culture in New York City
Italian-American culture in Philadelphia